The Hovercraft Museum, in Lee-on-the-Solent, Hampshire, England is a museum run by a registered charity dedicated to hovercraft. 

The museum has a collection of over 60 hovercraft of various designs. Situated at HMS Daedalus by the large slipway from where many hovercraft have been tested, the museum collection includes SR.N5 and SR.N6 hovercraft. The collection also contains the last remaining SR.N4 craft, the world's largest civil hovercraft, which has been laid up in Lee-on-the-Solent since cross-Channel services ceased on 1 October 2000.

The museum houses the world's largest library of documents, publications, film, video, photographs and drawings on hovercraft, all of which is available for research by prior arrangement. A number of hovercraft manufacturers have deposited their complete archives with the museum for safekeeping, thus swelling this important repository of information.

The museum also contains a large collection of original manufacturers' hovercraft models including the world's first working hovercraft model built by Christopher Cockerell.

The museum reopened in January 2016 after being closed for essential structural building work over nearly two years. Shortly afterwards the remaining SR.N4 craft came under threat of scrapping when the site owners, the Homes and Communities Agency, proposed the redevelopment of the land. The museum trust started a petition calling for one of the craft to be preserved.

Notes and references

External links

Pictures of Hovershow, 2004
Pictures of Hovershow. 2005
Pictures of Hovershow. 2006
The Hovercraft Museum and the Daedlus Slipway Intrigue 4K

 
Museum
Museums in Hampshire
Maritime museums in England
Gosport
1988 establishments in England